Kyrgia (also Κύρια - Kyria, before 1953: Οργαντζή - Organtzi) is a village and a community in the municipality of Doxato, Drama regional unit, northern Greece. The community consists of the following villages:

The former turkish name of Ypsilo was Kasapli or Khasapli
The former turkish name of Vathychori was Arapli

References

Populated places in Drama (regional unit)